A Thousand Miles Behind released in August 2007, contains 12 live covers, recorded between 2001 and 2007. The album title comes from a line in Bob Dylan's "One Too Many Mornings." The compilation is only available  from Gray's official website or at Gray's live performances. There are four versions of the album available for purchase, at different prices: as a CD, a 128 kbit/s mp3 download, a 256 kbit/s mp3 download, or a flac format. The tracks can also be downloaded individually in all of the digital formats.

Track listing

References

External links
 David Gray's official home page
 David Gray collection at the Internet Archive's live music archive

David Gray (musician) albums
2007 compilation albums
Self-released albums